"Rihanna" is a song by British rapper Yxng Bane. It was released as a single through Disturbing London on 14 August 2017, peaking at number 40 on the UK chart. The song was written by Gordon Egwu, Bane and Uzezi Oniko, and produced by Legendary Beats.

Track listing

Charts

Certifications

References

2017 singles
2017 songs
Rihanna
Yxng Bane songs